Louis Randall Williams Jr. (born April 11, 1979) is a former professional American football player who played as a center in the National Football League (NFL) for two seasons for the Carolina Panthers. He played in two games in the 2002 season for the team.

Williams attended Louisiana State University, where he played college football for the LSU Tigers football team. He was selected to the Associated Press All-Southeastern Conference first-team in 2000. He was born in Fort Walton Beach, Florida and attended Choctawhatchee High School.

References

Living people
1979 births
LSU Tigers football players
Players of American football from Florida
People from Fort Walton Beach, Florida
Choctawhatchee High School alumni
Carolina Panthers players
American football centers